Steve Huffman is an American politician who is a former member of the Arizona House of Representatives, serving from January 1999 until January 2007. He was first elected to the House in November 1998, representing District 12, and won re-election to that district in 2000. After redistricting in 2002, Huffman was reelected in both 2002, now representing District 26, and 2004.

References

Republican Party members of the Arizona House of Representatives
Living people
Year of birth missing (living people)